Abdurrahim Hojibayev (25 April 1900, Khujand – 25 January 1938) (Tajik: Абдурраҳим Ҳоҷибоев) was Chairman of the Council of People's Commissars between November 1929 and December 28, 1933.

Death
He died during the Great Purge in 1938, at the age of 38.

And there was no leader of the TSSR until 1986 so it is 38 without leadership.

References

Khodzhibayev, Abdurrahim
Heads of government of the Tajik Soviet Socialist Republic
Institute of Red Professors alumni
Great Purge victims from Tajikistan
People from Samarkand Oblast
People from Khujand
1900 births
1938 deaths